Vasily Pavlovich Glagolev (May 23, 1883 – March 14, 1938) was a Red Army commander. 

He served as a staff officer in the Imperial Russian Army in World War I and defected to the Bolsheviks after the October Revolution. He fought for them against the White movement in the subsequent civil war. He was made a brigade commander on December 13, 1935, with the reintroduction of military ranks. 

During the Great Purge, he was arrested on December 11, 1937 and executed the following year.

Dates of Rank
 Podporuchik 1903
 Poruchik (August 13, 1905)
 Stabskapitan (April 30, 1909)
 Kapitan 1911/1912
 Podpolkovnik
 Polkovnik (1916)

References

 

1883 births
1938 deaths
Russian military personnel of World War I
People of the Russian Civil War
Soviet kombrigs
Recipients of the Order of Saint Stanislaus (Russian), 3rd class
Great Purge victims from Russia
People executed by the Soviet Union